Lieutenant General Sir John Owen,  (1777–1857) was a Royal Marines officer who served as Deputy Adjutant-General Royal Marines.

Military career
Owen was commissioned into the Royal Marines. He commanded a marine battalion which repulsed an enemy force four times its size near San Sebastián in Spain in March 1836 during the First Carlist War. He became Deputy Adjutant-General Royal Marines (the professional head of the Royal Marines) in November 1836, before retiring in December 1854.

References

 

 

1777 births
1857 deaths
Royal Marines generals
Knights Commander of the Order of the Bath
Military personnel of the First Carlist War